Culshaw is a surname. Notable people with the surname include:

John Culshaw (1924–1980), English classical record producer
Jon Culshaw (born 1968), English impressionist and comedian
Mitchell Culshaw (born 2001), English footballer 
Peter Culshaw (born 1973), English boxer

See also
Cutshaw